Dalmand is a village in Tolna County, Hungary.

External links 
 Street map 

Populated places in Tolna County